is a former Japanese football player.

Playing career
Tateishi was born in Makurazaki on June 9, 1983. After graduating from high school, he joined J2 League club Avispa Fukuoka in 2002. He got opportunities to play from first season. In October 2003, he was loaned to Regional Leagues club Thespa Kusatsu. In 2004, he returned to Avispa. However he could hardly play in the match. In September 2005, he moved to J2 club Sagan Tosu. However he could hardly play in the match. In October 2006, he moved to Regional Leagues club V-Varen Nagasaki. He played many matches in 2007. Although he could not play many matches, V-Varen was promoted to Japan Football League end of 2008 season. He played many matches again in 2009 and retired end of 2009 season.

Club statistics

References

External links

library.footballjapan.jp

1983 births
Living people
Association football people from Kagoshima Prefecture
Japanese footballers
J2 League players
Japan Football League players
Avispa Fukuoka players
Thespakusatsu Gunma players
Sagan Tosu players
V-Varen Nagasaki players
Association football defenders